Ranunculus plebeius is a species of plant in the family Ranunculaceae.

Description

Range

Habitat

Ecology

Etymology

Taxonomy

References

plebeius